The Reinbach is a stream in South Tyrol, Italy, known as the Rio di Riva in Italian. It flows into the Ahr in Sand in Taufers. The river is also a popular kayaking spot.

References

External links 

Rivers of Italy
Rivers of South Tyrol
Rieserferner-Ahrn Nature Park